The 85th Regiment Illinois Volunteer Infantry was an infantry regiment that served in the Union Army during the American Civil War.

Service
The 85th Illinois Infantry was organized at Peoria, Illinois and mustered into Federal service on August 27, 1862.

The regiment was mustered out on June 5, 1865.

Total strength and casualties
The regiment suffered 4 officers and 86 enlisted men who were killed in action or who died of their wounds and 1 officers and 131 enlisted men who died of disease, for a total of 222 fatalities.

Commanders
Colonel Robert S. Moore - Resigned due to disability June 14, 1863.
Colonel Caleb James Dilworth - Mustered out with the regiment.

See also
List of Illinois Civil War Units
Illinois in the American Civil War

Notes

References
The Civil War Archive

Units and formations of the Union Army from Illinois
1862 establishments in Illinois
Military units and formations established in 1862
Military units and formations disestablished in 1865